Rochus Westbroek (born 7 August 1971) is a Dutch field hockey player.

He played for the Dutch hockey team HC Klein Zwitserland.

References

1971 births
Living people
Dutch male field hockey players
Field hockey players from The Hague
HC Klein Zwitserland players